Lance Corporal Carlos Halidu Giwa was in the Ghana Army. He led a military coup d'etat with Sergeant Abdul Malik on June 19, 1983.

The coup
Though the coup attempt failed, lives were changed from that day. One of the casualties of that day was Boakye Agyarko who was shot and left at the 37 Military Hospital for dead. He survived and became a Vice President of the Bank of New York.

References

Ghanaian military personnel